Çakırbağ can refer to:

 Çakırbağ
 Çakırbağ, Bayramören
 Çakırbağ, Kale